A leadership election for Christian and Democratic Union – Czechoslovak People's Party (KDU-ČSL) was held on 30 May 2009. Cyril Svoboda was elected leader of the party. Incumbent leader Jiří Čunek was eliminated in the first round. Other candidates were Jan Březina and Michael Šojdrová. Svoboda's victory was welcomed by Social democratic leader Jiří Paroubek because Svoboda represents left wing in the party.

Results

References

KDU-ČSL leadership elections
Indirect elections
2009 elections in the Czech Republic
Christian and Democratic Union - Czechoslovak People's Party leadership election
May 2009 events in Europe